The Accounting and Corporate Regulatory Authority (ACRA) is a statutory board under the Ministry of Finance of the Government of Singapore. ACRA is the regulator of business registration, financial reporting, public accountants and corporate service providers. ACRA also plays the role of a facilitator for the development of business entities and the public accountancy profession.

History
ACRA was formed on 1 April 2004 by the Accounting and Corporate Regulatory Act, which resulted in the merger of the then Registry of Companies and Businesses (RCB), and the Public Accountants’ Board (PAB). The merger was to synergise the monitoring of companies’ compliance with disclosure requirements, and the regulation of public accountants performing statutory audit.

Overview
The Accounting and Corporate Regulatory Authority (ACRA) is the regulator of business registration, financial reporting, public accountants and corporate service providers. ACRA's role is to monitor corporate compliance with disclosure requirements and regulation of public accountants performing statutory audit. ACRA is both the registrar and regulator for corporate services.

See also
 List of company registers
 Inland Revenue Authority of Singapore
 Goods & Service Tax Singapore
 Income tax in Singapore

References

External links 
 BizFile - ACRA's one-stop business services portal
 Ministry of Finance 
 Singapore Government
 https://www.acra.gov.sg/

Organisations of the Singapore Government
Statutory boards of the Singapore Government
2004 establishments in Singapore
Registrars of companies
Regulation in Singapore